Acnalbasac Noom (also known as Slapp Happy or Slapphappy) is a studio album by German-British avant-pop group Slapp Happy, recorded in Wümme, Bremen, Germany in 1973 with Faust as their backing band. It had a working title of Casablanca Moon but was never released at the time because it had been rejected by their record label, Polydor. Slapp Happy later re-recorded the album in 1974 for Virgin Records, who released it in 1974 as Slapp Happy. The original 1973 recording of Casablanca Moon, was released as Slapp Happy or Slapphappy by Recommended Records in 1980, and reissued as Acnalbasac Noom in 1982. The title Acnalbasac Noom appears in the lyrics of the song "Casablanca Moon", and is Casablanca Moon with the words written backwards.

The track titles on Acnalbasac Noom are identical to those on Slapp Happy, except for the track sequence, and that "Haiku" on Slapp Happy is replaced by "Charlie 'n Charlie" on Acnalbasac Noom. An instrumental version of "Charlie 'n Charlie" had been released as the title tune of Slapp Happy's first album, Sort Of. Musically, Acnalbasac Noom is arranged quite differently from Slapp Happy: it has a raw and unsophisticated "rock" feel about it, whereas Slapp Happy tends to be more sentimental and "dreamy" with complex arrangements, including a string orchestra. While the unsophisticated feel of Acnalbasac Noom still appeals to many fans, it was the sentimental sound on Slapp Happy that the band became best known for.

Track listing
All music composed by Anthony Moore and Peter Blegvad, except where noted.

Personnel
Anthony Moore – keyboards, guitar
Peter Blegvad – guitar, vocals
Dagmar Krause – vocals

Guests (Faust)
Jean-Hervé Péron – bass guitar
Werner "Zappi" Diermaier – drums
Gunther Wüsthoff – saxophone

Sound and art work
Uwe Nettelbeck – producer
Kurt Graupner – engineer
Peter Blegvad – cover art work

CD reissues
In 1990 Recommended Records reissued Acnalbasac Noom on CD with four extra tracks:
"Everybody's Slimmin' (Even Men and Women)" (Moore/Blegvad) – 4:07
"Blue Eyed William (demo)" (Blegvad) – 3:32
"Karen (demo)" (Blegvad) – 3:16
"Messages" (Krause) – 2:07

In 2000 Recommended Records issued a remastered (by Bob Drake) edition with the same artwork and tracks. The same remaster was also issued as a Japanese mini-LP sleeve with the original LP artwork.

References

External links
Peter Blegvad Discography
Slapp Happy: Acnalbasac Noom (archived 24 October 2009)

1980 albums
Slapp Happy albums
Recommended Records albums
Albums produced by Uwe Nettelbeck
Avant-pop albums